Josiah Twum-Boafo (born ) is a South African rugby union player for the  in the Pro14. His regular position is centre or wing.

Twum-Boafo was born in Butterworth to a Ghanaian father and a mother from Trinidad and Tobago.

In 2019, Twum-Boafo was contracted by the  Pro14 franchise and he made his first class debut in October 2019, coming on as a replacement in their match against  and making his first start the following week against .

References

South African rugby union players
Living people
Xhosa people
1997 births
People from Mnquma Local Municipality
Rugby union centres
Rugby union wings
Southern Kings players
Rugby union players from the Eastern Cape
Eastern Province Elephants players